Stygobromus albapinus, the White Pine amphipod,  is a troglomorphic species of amphipod in family Crangonyctidae. It is endemic to White Pine County, Nevada, where it occurs only in two pools in Model Cave in the Great Basin National Park.

References

Freshwater crustaceans of North America
Cave crustaceans
Crustaceans described in 2011
albapinus
Endemic fauna of Nevada